Anatoly Zaytsev may refer to:
 Anatoly Zaytsev (skier)
 Anatoly Zaytsev (politician)